is a 2004 novel by Japanese author Haruki Murakami.

Plot summary
Set in metropolitan Tokyo over the course of one night, characters include Mari Asai, a 19-year-old student, who is spending the night reading in a Denny's. There she meets Takahashi Tetsuya, a trombone-playing student who loves Curtis Fuller's "Five Spot After Dark" song on Blues-ette; Takahashi knows Mari's sister Eri, who he was once interested in, and insists that the group of them have hung out before. Meanwhile, Eri is in a deep sleep next to a television and seems to be haunted by a menacing figure.

Mari crosses paths with a retired female wrestler, Kaoru, now working as a manager in a love hotel called "Alphaville". Kaoru needs Mari to talk to a Chinese prostitute who had just been beaten in the love hotel by an office worker, Shirakawa. The group then tries to track down Shirakawa, and includes the Chinese Mafia group that 'owns' the prostitute.

In the love hotel Mari also hears stories from some of the staff working there and takes a glance at the other world hidden below the one we are aware of.

Parts of the story take place in a world between reality and dream, and each chapter begins with an image of a clock depicting the passage of time throughout the night.

Characters 

 Mari Asai, a 19-year-old student learning Chinese philology. As a child she went to a school for Chinese children. Mari is rather reserved when talking to strangers but however is keen on "making everything right".
 Tetsuya Takahashi, a trombone-playing student who, however, wants to stop practising music and start learning law. He is rather optimistic and doesn't want to live a big life.
 Kaoru, a retired female wrestler now working as a manager in the love hotel, "Alphaville". She is trustworthy, honest and always seeking justice.
 Shirakawa, an office worker who beat a Chinese prostitute in "Alphaville".

Structure
Like other Murakami novels, After Dark features a dual narrative. About half of the book focuses on Mari Asai and half focuses on her sister, Eri. There is a third narrative involving Shirakawa, but this is woven into Mari's half of the tale. Like his other novels, Murakami brings the two story threads together.

The novel is filled with symbols that can be understood in many different ways. Such strong symbols as music, night, light, cameras and not working television are used, and the author leaves it to his readers to interpret them in one way or another.

Reception
The novel received a 64% rating from the book review aggregator iDreamBooks based on 17 critics' reviews. A common point of criticism was the ending, or apparent lack thereof, which many critics found retroactively soured the rest of the book.

References

External links
 Comprehensive After Dark resource page
 The Guardian review
 Strange Horizons review
 After Dark at the Internet Book List

Novels by Haruki Murakami
2004 Japanese novels
Novels set in Tokyo
Kodansha books
Novels set in one day